Johud Bijar (also Romanized as Johūd Bījār) is a village in Gasht Rural District, in the Central District of Fuman County, Gilan Province, Iran. At the 2006 census, its population was 195, in 48 families.

References 

Populated places in Fuman County